Tutli may refer to:
 Tutli-ye Olya
 Tutli-ye Sofla